Shawl Bay, British Columbia, Canada, is a bay and locality on the west side of the Wishart Peninsula, which is to the east of Broughton Island, in the Inside Passage between Vancouver Island and the British Columbia mainland near the entrance to Kingcome Inlet. It can be approached from Penphrase Passage from the east, or Sutlej Channel from the west. There is a commercial marina at this location serving pleasure boaters.

See also
List of settlements in British Columbia

References

Bays of British Columbia
Central Coast of British Columbia
Unincorporated settlements in British Columbia